These are the international rankings of the Netherlands.

Culture

Economy

International Monetary Fund: Income per capita in purchasing power parity ranked 9 out of 181 (2011)
United Nations Development Programme:  Human Development Index ranked 3 out of 169 (2011)
 Gallup World Poll: happiness ranked 4 out of 155 (2009)
World Economic Forum: Global Competitiveness Report ranked 5 out of 144 (2012–2013).
World Economic Forum: Human Capital Report 2015 ranked 8 out of 124 (2015).
European Innovation Scoreboard ranked 5th out of 36 (2017)
Global Innovation Index 2017 ranked 3rd  out of 130 (2017)

Military

Institute for Economics and Peace: Global Peace Index ranked 25 out of 152 (2011)

Politics

RSF World Press Freedom Index ranked 6 out of 180 (2021)
Fraser Institute: World Freedom Index ranked 2 out of 123 (2013)
Transparency International: Corruption Perceptions Index ranked  9 out of 176 (2012)
Reporters Without Borders: Press Freedom Index ranked 3 out of 178 (2011-2012)
The Economist:  Democracy Index ranked 10 out of 167 (2011)
Fund For Peace: Failed States Index ranked 167 out of 177 (2012)
United Nations: e-Government Readiness Index ranked 2 out of 190 (2012)

Society
Main (reference) article: Society of the Netherlands 
OECD: Society at a Glance 2019. OECD Social Indicators  ranked 5 out of 36 (2019)

See also

Communications in the Netherlands
Education in the Netherlands
Geography of the Netherlands
Geology of the Netherlands
Demographics of the Netherlands
Government of the Netherlands
Foreign relations of the Netherlands
Law of the Netherlands
Military of the Netherlands

References

Netherlands, the